This is a list of people from Purvanchal region of Uttar Pradesh state of India.

Academics, science, and engineering
 Manindra Agrawal,  mathematician, engineer
Vagish Shastri, Sanskrit grammarian and yogi.
 Ziauddin Ahmad,  mathematician
 Amiya Charan Banerjee,  mathematician
 John B. Chitamber,  educational reformer
 Rajesh Gopakumar,  theoretical physicist at HRI; SSB Prize winner 
 Ganganath Jha,  scholar, philosopher
 Raj Narain Kapoor,  educational reformer
 Chittaranjan Mitra,  scientist
 Prem Chand Pandey
 Zahoor Qasim,  marine biologist
 Amitava Raychaudhuri,  theoretical particle physicist at HRI; SSB Prize winner
 Ashoke Sen,  string theorist; Fellow of the Royal Society; Milner Prize winner; theoretical physicist at HRI
 Obaid Siddiqui

Civil Servants 
 Vinod Rai former CAG.
 Vikas Swarup former diplomat and Secretary of Foreign Affairs.

Armed forces 
 Mahendra Nath Mulla
 Abdul Hamid
 Bhopinder Singh,  Lieutenant Governor of the Andaman and Nicobar Islands

Artists 
 Bismillah Khan
 Birju Maharaj
 Ravi Shankar
 Ram Chandra Shukla, painter
 Ram Kinkar Upadhyay

Criminals 
 Shri Prakash Shukla
 Ramakant Yadav
 Umakant Yadav
 Vijay mishra
Aarav Pathak
 Munna Bajrangi
 Rahu Yadav
Muktar Ansari

Brijesh Singh

Dhananjay Singh

Entertainment and media 
 Anjaan
 Kaifi Azmi
 Baba Azmi
 Amitabh Bachchan
 Harivansh Rai Bachchan
 Manoj Bajpai, actor.
 Pankaj Tripathi, actor.
 Parichay Das
 Vijay Bose,  theatre director and actor
 Sulochana Brahaspati,  singer
 Sudhir Dar,  cartoonist
 Dinesh Lal Yadav, actor and politician.
 Manoj Tiwari, actor and Politician. 
 Amrapali Dubey, actress.
 Girija Devi
 Siddheshwari Devi
 Rajkumari Dubey
 Anshuman Jha,  actor
 Anurag Kashyap,  film director
 Ravi Kishan, Bollywood actor and Politician.
 Kishan Maharaj
 Nalin Mazumdar,  guitarist
 Chhannulal Mishra
 Rajan and Sajan Mishra
 Gopal Shankar Misra
 Lalmani Misra
 Indrani Mukherjee,  actress
 Hemanta Kumar Mukhopadhyay
 Chunky Pandey
 Sudhanshu Pandey
 Kinsey Peile,  playwright, actor
 Rahi Masoom Raza
 Sameer
 Jhanak Shukla
 Saurabh Shukla
 Supriya Shukla
 Vinay Shukla
 Kapila Vatsyayan

Entrepreneurs 
 Subrata Roy
 Banarasidas
 Piyush Pandey
 Prasoon Pandey
 Sandeep Pandey

Freedom fighters and kings 

 Mangal Pandey
 Chittu Pandey
 Veer Abdul Hamid
 Vibhuti Narayan Singh Maharaja Banaras Kashinaresh  
 Rewati Raman Singh

Politicians 
 Jawaharlal Nehru, First Prime minister of India.
 Rajendra Prasad, First President of India.
 Lal Bahadur Shastri, Former Prime minister of India.
 Indira Gandhi, Former  Prime minister of India. 
 Mohammad Hamid Ansari, Former Vice President of India. 
 Chandra Shekhar, Former Prime minister of India. 
 Jai Prakash Narayan, Independence activist. 
 Vir Bahadur Singh, Former Chief minister of Uttar Pradesh. 
 Rajnath Singh Defense Minister of India and Ex-Chief Minister of Uttar Pradesh. 
 Aarav pathak(Ravan), Chief Minister of Uttar Pradesh. 
 Giriraj Kishore
 Kalraj Mishra
 Kamlesh Paswan
 Raj Narain
 Prem Prakash Pandey
 Jagdambika Pal
 Jharkhande Rai
 Anupriya Patel
 Sone Lal Patel
 Mahaveer Prasad
 Kalpnath Rai
 Krishnanand Rai
 Sampurnanand
 Sahajanand Saraswati
 Surya Pratap Shahi
 Amar Singh
 Om Prakash Singh
 Tribhuvan Narain Singh
 Manoj Sinha
 Hari Shankar Tiwari
 Kamalapati Tripathi
 Ram Naresh Yadav
 Ramakant Yadav
 Om Prakash Rajbhar
 Ajai Rai 
 Avadhesh Singh
 Kripashankar Singh
 Pramod Tiwari
 Ajay Kumar Lallu 
 Atul Rai
 Nadeem Javed
 Gopal Rai

Social activists 
 Veer Bhadra Mishra, academic, environmentalist
 Billy Arjan Singh, conservationist

Spiritual leaders 
 Bhagwan Das

Sportspeople

Badminton
 Suresh Goel

Baseball
 Rinku Singh

Cricket
 Narendra Hirwani
 Vicky Pathak(Ravan)
 Umesh Yadav
 Suresh Raina
 Mohammad Kaif
 Rudra Pratap Singh
 Piyush Chawala

Gymnastics
 Ashish Kumar, holder of silver and bronze Commonwealth Games medals
 Vivek Mishra, gymnast of Asian and Commonwealth games

Hockey
 Dhyan Chand
 Mohammed Shahid

Writers
 Premchand.
 Meena Alexander, poet
 Krishna Prakash Bahadur, writer
 Aniruddha Bahal, journalist, novelist
 Guru Bhakt Singh 'Bhakt'
 Dharamvir Bharati, author, poet
 Subhadra Kumari Chauhan, poet
 Satish Chandra, writer, historian
 Sudama Panday 'Dhoomil'
 Kapil Deva Dvivedi
 Shamsur Rahman Faruqi, poet
 Harisena, poet
 Bharatendu Harishchandra
 Sri Krishna Rai Hridyesh
 Rafiq Husain, writer, poet
 Ibn-e-Safi, novelist
 Laxmi Narayan Mishra
 Vidya Niwas Mishra
 Shibli Nomani
 Jaishankar Prasad
 Munshi Premchand
 Acharya Kuber Nath Rai
 Vibhuti Narain Rai, novelist
 Viveki Rai
 Rahul Sankrityayan
 Parichay Das
 Allan Sealy, author, writer
 Ramchandra Shukla
 Kedarnath Singh
 Julia Strachey, novelist, writer
 Sri Lal Sukla
 Baldev Upadhyaya
 Sachchidananda Vatsyayan
 Amish Tripathi

References

Purvanchal